Venerable John the Hermit began his ascetic life at a young age according to records.  He was born in the fourth century in Armenia to Juliana, a devout Eastern Orthodox Christian mother. John was the spiritual son of St. Pharmutius who discipled him for a time.  Eventually, John chose to enter into a greater solitude, taking abode in the depths of a dry well where Pharmutius would bring him bread daily; bread provided by an angel according to sacred tradition.

Venerable John lived the life of hermit with great ascetic fervor for ten years and then is held to have gone to the Lord.

John the Hermit is commemorated 29 March in the Orthodox Church and Eastern Catholic Churches of Byzantine rite. The Orthodox Church also commemorates him on 16 October.

See also

Armenian Orthodox Church
Armenian Catholic Church
Armenian Rite
Daniel the Stylite

References

External links
Serbian Orthodox Diocese of Western USA

Armenian hermits
Saints of the Armenian Apostolic Church
4th-century births
Year of birth missing

Year of death missing
4th-century Christian saints
4th-century Armenian people
Eastern Orthodox saints
Eastern Catholic saints